Saadatabad (also Romanized as Sa‘ādatābād) is a village in Abarj Rural District, Dorudzan District, Marvdasht County, Fars Province, Iran. At the 2006 census, its population was 510, in 123 families.

References 

Populated places in Marvdasht County